The 2021 Baden Masters was held from August 20 to 22 at the Curling Club Baden Regio in Baden, Switzerland as part of the World Curling Tour. The event was held in a round-robin format with a purse of 35,000 CHF. It was the first men's event of the 2021–22 curling season. The event category for the event was 500.

In the final, Yannick Schwaller and his team from Bern defeated the Peter de Cruz rink from Geneva in a rematch of the 2021 Swiss Men's Curling Championship final. The final also served as a precursor for the 2021 Swiss Olympic Curling Trials which will be held September 22–26 to determine the Swiss team that will represent Switzerland at the 2022 Winter Olympics. To reach the final, Schwaller defeated the 2021 World Champions and reigning Baden Masters champions Team Niklas Edin from Karlstad, Sweden 5–4 and de Cruz beat the Steffen Walstad rink from Oslo, Norway 5–3. Teams Noé Traub, Joël Retornaz, Yves Stocker and Magnus Ramsfjell all reached the quarterfinals.

For the first time in the event's twenty-one year history, two women's teams competed alongside the men's field. Originally, two teams from Scotland were scheduled to compete, but had to pull out last minute due to the slow vaccination rate in the United Kingdom. 2018 Olympic Gold Medalists Team Anna Hasselborg from Sweden competed in Pool D and Team Irene Schori of Limmattal, Switzerland competed in Pool B.

Teams
The teams are listed as follows:

Round-robin standings 
Final round-robin standings

Round-robin results
All draw times listed in Central European Time.

Draw 1
Friday, August 20, 8:00 am

Draw 2
Friday, August 20, 10:30 am

Draw 3
Friday, August 20, 1:00 pm

Draw 4
Friday, August 20, 4:00 pm

Draw 5
Friday, August 20, 6:30 pm

Draw 6
Friday, August 20, 9:00 pm

Draw 7
Saturday, August 21, 8:00 am

Draw 8
Saturday, August 21, 10:30 am

Draw 9
Saturday, August 21, 1:45 pm

Draw 10
Saturday, August 21, 4:15 pm

Playoffs

Source:

Quarterfinals
Saturday, August 21, 8:30 pm

Semifinals
Sunday, August 22, 9:00 am

Final
Sunday, August 22, 1:30 pm

References

External links
Official Website
CurlingZone

Baden Masters
2021 in curling
2021 in Swiss sport
August 2021 sports events in Switzerland
21st century in Baden-Württemberg
Baden, Switzerland